Santa Cruz is a municipality in the Honduran department of Lempira.

It is one of the most hidden municipalities of the Lempira department. It is 70 km away from the city of Gracias, forced to pass by San Juan del Caite in Intibuca.

History 

Its former name was "Guaticaitique", after that it was "Santa Cruz de Guasabosque". In the census of 1887 it was a village of Erandique. On 26 October 1926 it was granted the title of municipality in the administration of president Miguel Paz Barahona.

Geography 

As in the rest of the department, one cannot miss the high, steep mountains on their way to the municipality capital. Also on the road there are a couple of quarries, they provide material for the maintenance of the road. Rocks of different colours and hardnesses may be seen. It has a great amount of forest resources, but all around the municipality capital, less trees are seen. Pine forests are the most prevalent, but there is also a good amount of Liquidambar forest.

Boundaries 
Its boundaries are: 
North : La Campa municipality.
South : Erandique and San Andrés municipalities.
East  : Intibuca department.
West  : San Andrés municipality.
Surface Extents: 150 km2

Resources 
This is one of the poorest municipalities of the department. The coffee plantations are the main industry. Cattle raising, corn and beans crops follow but are mostly for local use. It has electricity and mobile communication services and water is sourced from wells. According to the elder inhabitants, close to the municipality capital there is a big deposit of several metals, but the owner of this property has no intention to exploit it and has rejected some millionaire offers from multi-nationals companies.

Population 
Population:For the year 2001 this municipality had 4,929 people, this figure was the base for an estimate, resulting in 7,089 people for the year of 2015.
Villages: 6
Settlements: 61

Demographics
At the time of the 2013 Honduras census, Santa Cruz municipality had a population of 6,770. Of these, 69.15% were Indigenous, 30.43% Mestizo, 0.38% Black or Afro-Honduran and 0.03% White.

Tourism 

The deviation for this municipality capital is not easy to see, it is approximately 20 km away from San Juan del Caite, right across a football field. From the deviation to the capital the road is not in the best conditions. There is not much to see in the municipality capital. Perhaps for people who like to visit old colonial buildings, its church is a forced stop. Without doubt, the best feature of this municipality is its Liquidambar forest because their leaves change colours, depending on the season of the year. Also, it can be interesting to see the descendants of the Indians, since they still keep a lot of features of their ancestors.

Local Holidays: "Santa Cruz" day on 3 May and "San Francisco" day on 4 October.

References

External links
 Official website

Municipalities of the Lempira Department